The Professional Karate Association (PKA), later Professional Karate & Kickboxing Association, now--effective March 1, 2022 PKA Worldwide--was originally a martial arts sanctioning organization, now transformed into a martial arts promotion company. 
Through the 1970s, the PKA was the major professional kickboxing organization in the United States and in Europe, featuring such fighters as Bill "Superfoot" Wallace, Joe Lewis, Benny "the Jet" Urquidez, The Iceman Jean-Yves Thériault, Dennis "the Terminator" Alexio, Rick "the Jet" Roufus, Scott "The Hammer" Bennington, Jerry Trimble and Jeff Smith.

The Professional Karate Association was formed in 1974 by Don and Judy Quine in association with Mike Anderson. It was launched with the initial world championships in 1974 at the Los Angeles Sports Arena, and was telecast on ABC's Wide World of Entertainment. The winners of the initial championship were Joe Lewis (heavyweight), Jeff Smith (light heavyweight), Bill "Superfoot" Wallace (middleweight), and Isiasis Duenas (lightweight). Additionally, Vernon Mason (also called Vernon "Thunder Kick Mason") would become US PKA's first bantamweight champion after knocking out Sonny Onowa.

Joe Corley joined the PKA in 1977 and together with Glenn Keeney (RIP), Jerry Piddington, John Therien in Canada, George Sfetas in England and many others in the US organized the committees that would control the sport of full contact karate for the next 9 years. The PKA went on to have a long term relationship with ESPN that lasted until 1986, while also airing a series of fights on CBS under the watch of CBS Sports VP Barry Frank and on NBC via Sean McManus.  The PKA was by far the most visible sanctioning body for what became better known as kickboxing in the United States, in 1982 sanctioning 43% of events worldwide.  and producing more than 1,000 hours of television content.

The PKA signed many fighters to exclusive contracts in order to build its brand in the sport. Some fighters chose to go to other competing organizations, but the PKA was the most well-known. The PKA sanctioned fights exclusively with what has become known as "full contact rules" which permit kicks only above the waist as opposed to the "international rules" advocated by other organizations. In 1989 Joe Corley gained the rights to PKA in an out-of-court settlement ending a 3-year dispute with his PKA partners. The PKA has since operated as a promotion company.

The PKA hosted fights with SHOWTIME through the 90s and held its first pay-per-view event with SHOWTIME featuring Jean Yves Theriault vs Rick Roufus, Dennis Alexio vs Dick Kimber and Paul Vizzio vs Juan Torres, but went dormant shortly thereafter. PKA President Joe Corley said just this past year in an interview in the newly published PKA WORLDWIDE magazine that "an inadvertent series of decisions by a broadcast executive wreaked unparalleled havoc on the momentum we had built for 20 years, and quite frankly, I had to take a hiatus following the 2 decades of grueling--yet exciting and inspiring- television and promotion work. I put my personal energy into our Joe Corley American Karate studios in Atlanta, training our instructors how to operate professional studios as the interest in Martial Arts had continued to explode. *

In March, 2022, PKA CEO Joe Corley announced the re-launch of PKA as PKA WORLDWIDE. As of October 31, 2022, PKA WORLDWIDE had named members of its PKA WORLDWIDE LEADERSHIP TEAM to include 3 co-Presidents: Jeff Smith, Rich Rose and Howard Dolgon. Joe Corley announced that PKA WORLDWIDE was undertaking its HUNT FOR THE GREATEST STRIKERS ON THE PLANET, and as of October 31, 2022 has held auditions in New York, Fort Worth, Redlands, California, Arlington, Texas and South Hill, Washington.

See also
 Martin T. Buell – former commissioner of the PKA

References

External links
 

1974 establishments in the United States
Karate organizations
Japanese karate
Full contact karate
Kickboxing organizations
Karate